is a Japanese actor and tarento. He is represented with Shochiku Entertainment.

Filmography

Dramas

Variety

Films

Direct-to-video

Advertisements

Stage

References

External links
 
 Official Blog 
 Former Official Blog 
Oricon Geinōjin Jiten "Masaki Nishina no Profile" 

Johnny & Associates
Male actors from Tokyo
1982 births
Living people
21st-century Japanese singers
21st-century Japanese male singers